Stefan Petrović may refer to:

 Stefan Petrović (footballer, born 1990), Serbian footballer
 Stefan Petrović (footballer, born 1993), Austrian footballer